The Last Kiss is a 2001 Italian comedy-drama film written and directed by Gabriele Muccino.

It was remade into The Last Kiss in 2006 by Tony Goldwyn starring Zach Braff and Rachel Bilson.

A sequel to the film was released in Italy in February 2010.

Plot
Giulia (Giovanna Mezzogiorno) and Carlo (Stefano Accorsi) have been happy together for three years, but Giulia's announcement that she is pregnant sends him into a secret panic. Terrified at his imminent entry into the adult world of irreversible responsibilities, Carlo finds himself tempted by a bewitching 18-year-old girl, Francesca (Martina Stella), whom he meets by chance at a wedding. The possibility of one last youthful crazy fling before the impending prison of parenthood proves to be too attractive to resist.

But a short-term fling with Francesca comes with serious consequences that threaten to damage his three-year relationship with Giulia, who is expecting a baby girl. At the same time, it also dashes the idealistic hopes of Francesca, who dreams of a beautiful future with him. After a raucous quarrel in the night, Carlo goes to Francesca's house, where they have sex. However, the morning after, reality sinks on Carlo and the enormity of what he had done surfaces. But it is not easy for Giulia to forgive, or to trust him again.

Cast

 Giovanna Mezzogiorno: Giulia
 Stefano Accorsi: Carlo  
 Stefania Sandrelli: Anna
 Martina Stella: Francesca
 Pierfrancesco Favino: Marco
 Claudio Santamaria: Paolo
 Sabrina Impacciatore: Livia
 Giorgio Pasotti: Adriano
 Sergio Castellitto: Prof. Eugenio Bonetti
 Regina Orioli: Arianna
 Marco Cocci: Alberto
 Luigi Diberti: Emilio
 Daniela Piazza: Veronica
 Lina Bernardi: Adele 
 Piero Natoli: Michele
 Vittorio Amandola: Mimmo 
 Giulia Carmignani: Mariposa
 Silvio Muccino: fiancee of Mariposa
 Carmen Consoli: lover of Alberto

Reception
The film grossed $12 million in Italy and $17.8 million worldwide.

External links

References

2001 films
2001 romantic comedy-drama films
2000s Italian-language films
Films set in Italy
Films set in Rome
Films directed by Gabriele Muccino
Italian romantic comedy-drama films
2000s Italian films
Fandango (Italian company) films